Events from the year 1710 in Denmark.

Incumbents
 Monarch – Frederick IV
 Grand Chancellor – Christian Christophersen Sehested

Events

 10 March  The Battle of Helsingborg.
 4 October – The Dannebroge explodes and sinks at the Battle of Køge Bay, almost all of its crew of 600 are killed.
 26 November  The Battle of Wismar.

Undated
 Ladegården is converted into a military hospital.

Births
 23 January – Jakob Langebek, historian (died 1775)
 10 March – Christian Ditlev Reventlow, Privy Councillor and nobleman (born 1775)
 10 November – Adam Gottlob von Moltke, courtier and diplomat (died 1792)
 Catarina Gustmeyer, businessperson

Deaths
 19 September – Ole Rømer, astronomer (born 1644)
  31 December  Henrik Bornemann, clergyman and theologian (born 1646)

References

 
1710s in Denmark
Denmark
Years of the 18th century in Denmark